Jaelani Arey Sibi (born 24 April 1990) is an Indonesian footballer.

Club career
He joined Persipura Jayapura for the 2014 Indonesia Super League.

References

External links
 Profile at ligaindonesia.co.id 
 Profile at goal.com
 

1990 births
Living people
People from Wamena
Indonesian footballers
Persiwa Wamena players
Persipura Jayapura players
Badak Lampung F.C. players
Liga 1 (Indonesia) players
Association football defenders
Association football wing halves
Papuan sportspeople